Techila Distributed Computing Engine (earlier known as Techila Grid) is a commercial grid computing software product. It speeds up simulation, analysis and other computational applications by enabling scalability across the IT resources in user's on-premises data center and in the user's own cloud account. Techila Distributed Computing Engine is developed and licensed by Techila Technologies Ltd, a privately held company headquartered in Tampere, Finland. The product is also available as an on-demand solution in Google Cloud Launcher, the online marketplace created and operated by Google. According to IDC, the solution enables organizations to create HPC infrastructure without the major capital investments and operating expenses required by new HPC hardware.

Product features
Techila Distributed Computing Engine is a distributed computing middleware and management solution, which can be used to access and manage on-premises and cloud IT resources for various high-performance computing (HPC) computing uses, including high-throughput computing (HTC) scenarios. It creates a scalable computing service and execution environment that can also support applications that are deployed within production environments.

The technology of Techila Distributed Computing Engine is built on an autonomic computing architecture that is patented by Techila Technologies. This has enabled features such as automated system management and fault tolerance, which simplify the deployment, use and administration of large-scale distributed computing systems.

Architecture

Techila Server
Techila Server is a Java-based software product, which optimizes the performance of a Techila Distributed Computing Engine environment and the jobs in it. The optimization done by Techila Server supports not only large jobs, but also makes the system suitable for running small computational jobs. The performance of Techila Distributed Computing Engine in different scenarios was evaluated in a thesis at Tampere University of Technology.

Originally, the Techila Server was delivered as an embedded appliance. The embedded appliance product was discontinued in 2012. Currently, Techila Server is delivered either as a virtual appliance or using cloud-specific deployment tools.

Techila Worker
Techila Worker is the software agent that must be installed on each computer that will participate in a Techila Distributed Computing Engine environment. The computers can be physical, or they can be virtualized computers running on a hypervisor or in a cloud virtual machine. Techila Distributed Computing Engine supports following public cloud services: Microsoft Azure, Amazon ec2 and Google Compute Engine. Once the Techila Worker software is installed on a computer, it will authenticate the computer to the Techila Server using a certificate, and the system will use self-management to automatically configure the computer to run jobs received from the Techila Server.

Techila Worker is a Java-based client middleware component that can be run on Microsoft Windows or Linux. Because of this, the client computers participating in the Techila Distributed Computing Engine system can have different hardware and software platforms. Techila Worker software runs on the lowest possible priority on the computer. The Techila Worker is also interoperable with batch-queuing systems, like the SLURM, TORQUE, or Oracle Grid Engine (previously known as Sun Grid Engine, SGE). This interoperability allows existing HPC users to use their existing infrastructures as a part of a Techila Distributed Computing Engine system without the Techila Worker interfering with the other system.

Techila SDK
Techila SDK (earlier known as Techila Grid Management Kit or Techila GMK) is a library of software components that connect applications to the Techila Distributed Computing Engine environment. The SDK includes plug-ins for many commonly used research and development tools and languages, such as MATLAB, R, Python, Perl, Java,  C#/ .NET C/ C++, FORTRAN, and Command-line interface script. The applications that have been developed using application programming interfaces in the Techila SDK can also be deployed within production environments and run as service in a SOA environment. Techila SDK supports both Windows and Linux operating systems.

Administrator User Interface
A web-based Administrator User Interface provides administrators with a simplified and easy-to-use interface to the Techila Server. The Administrator User Interface allows monitoring system activity, view and control job execution, execution policy, monitor and control Techila Workers and Techila Worker Groups, control security settings, and manage users.

History
Techila Distributed Computing Engine technology started initially from the vision of grid computing and enablement of fast simulation and analysis without the complexity of traditional high-performance computing.

The security of Techila Distributed Computing Engine was evaluated by Nixu Ltd in 2008. After this, Techila Distributed Computing Engine has been accepted by security-sensitive industry sectors, such as Finance and Insurance, Engineering and Pharmaceutical.

Techila Distributed Computing Engine was demonstrated by a research team at the University of Helsinki in 2011 as being capable of providing autonomic management to computing environments of large numbers of Windows Azure cloud instances. The University of Helsinki has also demonstrated Techila Distributed Computing Engine's ability to enhance the usability and utilization of large-scale cluster resources in projects implemented using MATLAB, R, Python, Java, and C/ C++/ C#.

In a Techila Distributed Computing Engine system, computational resources can be arranged into device groups for organizational, security, compliance, and administrative control. Despite its performance in large-scale systems such as CSC - IT Center For Science, it is also suitable for smaller environments such as the TUTGrid] which utilizes the idle capacity of desktop PCs and other computers at Tampere University of Technology (TUT) for scientific computing.

External links
 Google Cloud Platform Blog about Techila available in Google Cloud Launcher
 Software Systems for Distributed Scientific Computing
 Innofinland Prizes of the President of the Republic 2009 to Techila
 ANSYS ADVANTAGE Volume VII - A Perfect Fit

References

Cloud computing providers
Grid computing products
Job scheduling
Distributed computing